The Shebelle Valley, also spelled  Shabeelle Valley, is a valley in the Horn of Africa.

It follows the line of the Shebelle River north from the Somali Sea through Somalia and into Ethiopia.

Along with the Jubba Valley and nearby lakes Chamo and Abaya, the valley is considered an Endemic Bird Area by Birdlife International.

See also
Nugaal Valley

References
Jubba and Shabeelle valleys

Shebelle River
Valleys of Ethiopia
Valleys of Somalia